The Cyclo-cross Superprestige 2021-22 – also known as the Telenet Superprestige for sponsorship reasons – is a season-long cyclo-cross competition held in Belgium and the Netherlands. Originally planned for 8 rounds, in December 2021 due to heightened measures to combat the COVID-19 pandemic in Belgium the manche in Diegem was cancelled.

Calendar

Men's competition

Women's competition

References

Notes

Cyclo-cross Superprestige
Superprestige
Superprestige